Myolysis may refer to:
Any breakdown of muscle tissue
Laser surgery of leiomyoma
Rhabdomyolysis, breakdown of skeletal muscle